The Terai Madhesh Loktantrik Party was a political party in Nepal, formed by former Minister and Nepali Congress national treasurer Mahantha Thakur. This party was once the biggest Madhesh based party with a strong base in Terai region of Nepal. The foundation of the party was announced on December 27, 2007. This party was made by Thakur with a popular slogan "Mare to Mukti, jiye to Madhesh" meaning if I will live, I will fight for Madhesh and if I will get salvation. This was very popular and is popular till date. The party had four members in the interim parliament including Thakur.

Merger to form Rastriya Janata Party Nepal 
On 21 April 2017 the party merged with Sadbhavana Party, Nepal Sadbhawana Party, Terai Madhes Sadbhawana Party, Madhesi Janaadhikar Forum (Republican) and Rastriya Madhesh Samajwadi Party to form Rastriya Janata Party Nepal.

Portfolios and Central Committee 

On December 31, 2007, a Central Working Committee of the party was formed, chaired by Mahantha Thakur. Other members are Hridayesh Tripathi, Brikhesh Chandra Lal, Brijesh Kumar Gupta, Mahendra Prasad Yadav, Ram Chandra Raya, Sarbendra Nath Shukla, Anish Ansari, Ram Chandra Kushwaha,  Srikrishna Yadav, Govinda Prasad Chaudhary, Ram Kumar Chaudhary, Ram Kumar Sharma, Jitendra Sonal, Bishwanath Saha, Satyawati Kurmi, Kritaram Kumhal, Dilip Singh and Sheikh Chandtara.  In 2073, this party conducted its first general convention in Nawalparasi. Presidents of two big democratic parties including Sher Bahadur Deuba from Nepali Congress, Pashupati Shumsher JBR from Rastriya Prajatantra Party were present here.

Chairman-Mahantha Thakur

Co-chairman-Hridayesh Tripathi

General Secretary-Brijesh Kumar Gupta, Jitendra Sonal, Jangi Lal Raya

Electoral performance 
The party obtained 3.49 per cent of the votes in 2008 and took 21 seats in Constituent Assembly election.

On December 31, 2010, the party suffered vertical split when 9 lawmakers led by Senior General Secretary and Minister of Industry Mahendra Raya Yadav separated and created new party named Terai Madhes Loktantrik Party-Nepal. The nine lawmakers were Ramani Raya, Govinda Chaudhary, Dan Bahadur Chaudhary, Chandan Shah, Salauddin Musalman, Sabitri Devi Yadav, Arbinda Sah and Urmila Mahato. According to medias, the party had to split due to differences in political ideology of Mahanta Thakur and Mahendra Raya Yadav. Thakur was from democratic background (Nepali Congress) while Yadav was communist background. This was one of the biggest set back to Madhesh Based politics and people.

In Second Constituent Assembly Election 2013, this party became the largest Madhesh based party in parliament although suffering two major and minor splits.

See also 

 Nepali Congress
 Nepal Loktantrik Forum
Terai–Madhesh Loktantrik Party
People's Progressive Party

References

2007 establishments in Nepal
Political parties established in 2007
Political parties of minorities in Nepal
Social democratic parties in Asia
Socialist parties in Nepal
2017 disestablishments in Nepal